The 1985 Tennents' Sixes was the second staging of the indoor 6-a-side football tournament at Ingliston Showground near Edinburgh on 20 and 21 January. It was again televised on BBC Scotland.

The format had changed from 3 groups of 3 teams to 2 groups of 10 with all from the 1984-85 Scottish Premier Division season except Celtic. First Division club Airdrieonians replaced them.

The two group winners and runners-up qualified to the semi-finals and Hearts beat Morton 4-1 in the final.

Group stage

Group 1

Group 2

Semi-finals

Final

References

External links
Scottish Football Historical Archive

Tennent's Sixes
1980s in Edinburgh
Sports competitions in Edinburgh
Football in Edinburgh
January 1985 sports events in the United Kingdom
Tennents' Sixes